Chelsea Finn is an American computer scientist and assistant professor at Stanford University. Her research investigates intelligence through the interactions of robots, with the hope to create robotic systems that can learn how to learn. She is part of the Google Brain group.

Early life and education 
Finn was an undergraduate student in electrical engineering at Massachusetts Institute of Technology. She moved to the University of California, Berkeley, where she studied gradient based algorithms in the Berkeley Artificial Intelligence Lab (BAIR). Such algorithms allow machines to 'learn to learn', more akin to human learning than traditional machine learning systems. These “meta-learning” techniques train machines to quickly adapt, such that when they encounter new scenarios they can learn quickly. As a doctoral student she worked as an intern at Google Brain, where she worked on robot learning algorithms from deep predictive models. She delivered a massive open online course on deep reinforcement learning. She was the first woman to win the C.V. & Daulat Ramamoorthy Distinguished Research Award.

Research and career 
Finn investigates the capabilities of robots to develop intelligence through learning and interaction. She has made use of deep learning algorithms to simultaneously learn visual perception and control robotic skills.

She developed meta-learning approaches to train neural networks to take in student code and output useful feedback. She showed that the system could quickly adapt without too much input from the instructor. She trialled the programme on Code in Place, a 12,000 student course delivered by Stanford University every year. She found that 97.9% of the time the students agreed with the feedback being given.

Awards and honors 

 2016 C.V. & Daulat Ramamoorthy Distinguished Research Award
 2017 Electrical Engineering and Computer Science Rising Star
 2018 MIT Technology Review 35 Under 35
 2018 ACM Doctoral Dissertation Award
 2020 Samsung Advanced Institute of Technology AI Researcher of the Year
 2020 Intel Rising Star Faculty Award
 2021 Office of Naval Research Young Investigator Award
 2022 IEEE Robotics and Automation Society Early Academic Career Award

Select publications

References 

Living people
University of California, Berkeley alumni
Massachusetts Institute of Technology alumni
Stanford University faculty
American computer scientists
American women scientists
Machine learning researchers
Year of birth missing (living people)